Rosamond Soong Ch'ing-ling (27 January 189329 May 1981) was a Chinese political figure. As the third wife of Sun Yat-sen, then Premier of the Kuomintang and President of the Republic of China, she was often referred to as Madame Sun Yat-sen. She was a member of the Soong family and, together with her siblings, played a prominent role in China's politics prior to and after 1949.

After the establishment of the People's Republic of China in 1949, she held several prominent positions in the new government, including Vice Chairman (1949–1954; 1959–1975) and Vice Chairman of the Standing Committee of the National People's Congress (1954–1959; 1975–1981), traveled abroad during the early 1950s, representing her country at a number of international events. During the Cultural Revolution, however, she was heavily criticized. Following the purge of President Liu Shaoqi in 1968, she and Dong Biwu as Vice Presidents became de facto Heads of State of China until 1972, when Dong was appointed Acting President. Soong survived the political turmoil during the Cultural Revolution but appeared less frequently after 1976. As the acting Chairwoman of the Standing Committee of the National People's Congress from 1976 to 1978, Soong was again the acting Head of State. During her final illness in May 1981, she was given the special title of "Honorary President of the People's Republic of China".

Life and activities before 1949 

Soong Ch'ing-ling was born to businessman and missionary Charlie Soong in Chuansha, Pudong, Shanghai, the second of six children. She graduated from McTyeire School for Girls in Shanghai, and Wesleyan College in Macon, Georgia, United States. Like her sisters, she spoke fluent English due to being educated in English for most of her life. Her Christian name was Rosamonde. In her early years, her passport name was spelled as Chung-ling Soong, and in her Wesleyan College diploma, her name was Rosamonde Chung-ling Soong.

Soong married Sun Yat-sen, leader of China's 1911 revolution and founder of the Kuomintang (KMT or Nationalist Party), on 25 October 1915. Even though he was a Christian, her parents greatly opposed the match, as he was 26 years her senior. 

After Sun's death in 1925, she was elected to the KMT Central Executive Committee. However, she left China for Moscow after the expulsion of the Communists from the KMT in 1927, accusing the KMT of betraying her husband's legacy. Her younger sister, May-ling, married Chiang Kai-shek, a Methodist like Soong and her sisters. This made Chiang Soong's brother-in-law. The Chinese Communist Party still treats Sun Yat-sen as one of the founders of their movement and claim descent from him as he is viewed as a proto-communist and the economic element of Sun's ideology was socialism. Sun stated, "Our Principle of Livelihood is a form of communism". After an initial warm public reception in Moscow for the cadre, to which Soong Ching-ling belonged, from 1928 their attempts to establish a leftist Chinese front were frustrated.

Soong returned to China in June 1929 when Sun Yat-sen was moved from his temporary burial site in Beijing to a new memorial in Nanjing, but left again three months later, and did not return until July 1931, when her mother died. She resided afterwards in Shanghai until July 1937, when the Second Sino-Japanese War broke out. Following the outbreak of hostilities, she moved first to Hong Kong (where she befriended future restaurateur and philanthropist Madame Wu [Sylvia Cheng]), then to Chongqing, the wartime capital of the Chinese government. In 1939, she founded the China Defense League, which raised funds and sought supplies primarily for the Chinese Communist controlled areas of northern China. In 1946, the League was renamed the China Welfare fund, continuing to seek funds and support for the Chinese Communists.

During the Chinese Civil War, Soong permanently broke with her family and supported the Communists. In 1948, she became honorary chairwoman of the Revolutionary Committee of the Kuomintang, a left-wing splinter group of the KMT that claimed to be the legitimate heir of Sun's legacy. With the collapse of the Nationalist government and the Communist victory in the civil war, she left Shanghai in September 1949 to attend the Chinese People's Political Consultative Conference (CPPCC), convened in Beijing by the Chinese Communist Party to establish a new Central People's Government. On 1 October, she was a guest at the ceremony in Tiananmen Square marking the birth of the new People's Republic of China. The Nationalist government issued an order for her arrest, but this was soon blocked by the swift military victory of the Communists. The KMT fled from mainland China to Taiwan soon after this.

Political offices and activities after 1949 

Soong was the third person in the new government mentioned by Mao in the founding Proclamation of the People's Republic of China.

Soong was held in great esteem by the victorious Communists, who reckoned her as a link between their movement and Sun's earlier movement. After the formal establishment of the People's Republic of China in 1949, she became one of six vice chairpeople of the Central People's Government," and one of several vice-chairpeople of the Sino-Soviet Friendship Association. In April 1951, it was announced that she had been awarded the Stalin Peace Prize for 1950.

In 1950, Soong became chairwoman of the Chinese People's Relief Administration, which combined several organizations dealing with welfare and relief issues. Her China Welfare Fund was reorganized as the China Welfare Institute and began publishing the magazine China Reconstructs, now published as China Today. In 1953, a collection of her writings, Struggle for New China, was published.

In 1953 Soong served on the committees preparing for elections to the new National People's Congress and the drafting of the 1954 constitution. Soong was elected a Shanghai deputy to the first NPC, which adopted the constitution at its first meeting in September 1954. She was elected one of 14 vice-chairpeople of the NPC's standing committee, chaired by Liu Shaoqi. In December of the same year, she was elected a vice-chairwoman of the CPPCC, which became a consultative body, and replaced Liu Shaoqi as chairperson of the Sino-Soviet Friendship Association. During this period, Soong traveled abroad several times, visiting Austria, India, Burma, Pakistan, and Indonesia. Her trips included a January 1953 visit to the Soviet Union, where she was received by Stalin shortly before his death. She visited Moscow again in 1957 with Mao Zedong's delegation to the 40th anniversary of the Russian Revolution.

Despite Soong’s support of the CCP, she was skeptical of some radical actions such as the purging of capitalists and party moderates such as Liu Shaoqi of the government.

Vice-presidency 

In April 1959, Soong again served as a Shanghai deputy at the 2nd National People's Congress. At this Congress, Mao Zedong and Zhu De stepped down as President and Vice-President of the People's Republic of China. Liu Shaoqi was elected State Chairman (President), and Soong Ching-ling and Dong Biwu, a senior Communist Party 'elder', were elected Vice President of China. Soong resigned at this time from her positions as vice-chairwoman of the CPPCC National Committee and the NPC Standing Committee. She was re-elected to the post of Vice-chairperson of the PRC at the Third National People's Congress in 1965, and appeared frequently in the early 1960s on ceremonial occasions, often greeting important visitors from abroad.

During the Cultural Revolution (1966–76), Soong was heavily criticized by Red Guard factions, and in one incident, the marker of her parents' grave was toppled and their bodies exposed. Following this incident Premier Zhou Enlai recommended that Soong Ching-ling be put on a "List of Cadres to be protected." Zhou's recommendation was approved by Mao Zedong.

Late in the Cultural Revolution, during the 4th NPC which approved the 1975 Constitution in January 1975, Soong's term as Vice President of China ended with the abolishment of that post, after which she was again appointed one of the vice-chairwomen of the NPC Standing Committee.

Later life and death 

Soong's public appearances were limited after the Cultural Revolution, and she was in generally poor health, but articles by her, primarily on children's welfare issues, continued to appear in the press. Her last public appearance was on 8 May 1981, when she appeared in a wheelchair at the Great Hall of the People to accept an honorary LL.D. degree from the University of Victoria. A few days later she began running a high fever and was unable to rise again. On 16 May 1981, less than two weeks before her death, she was admitted to the Communist Party and named Honorary Chairwoman of the People's Republic of China. She is the only person to ever hold this title. According to one of Soong's biographers, she had wanted to join the Chinese Communist Party as early as 1957. However, when she asked Liu for permission to join the party, the request was turned down because "it was thought better for the revolution that she not join formally, but that she would thenceforth be informed, and her opinion sought, concerning all important inner-Party events matters, not only those involving the government."

Soong Ching-ling wrote seven letters to criticize the Cultural Revolution Campaign and objected to the excessive violence against her colleagues and other moderates within the CCP.

Soong died on 29 May, 1981 in Beijing at the age of 88.

Museums 
According to her wishes, Soong's cremated remains were placed next to her parents' restored grave in the Soong family burial plot at Shanghai's International Cemetery, which was later renamed in her honor as the Soong Ching-ling Memorial Park.

Several of Soong Ch'ing-ling's former residences have also been transformed into museums:

In 1918, Soong and her husband Sun Yat-sen lived in a house in the French Concession of Shanghai. After her husband's death, Soong continued to reside there until 1937. The house has now been converted into a museum dedicated called the Former Residence of Sun Yat-sen. Though dedicated primarily to Sun, it also contains some of Soong's artefacts during their life together.

From 1948 to 1963 Soong Ch'ing-ling lived in the western end of the French Concession in Shanghai. This building is now the Soong Ching-ling Memorial Residence. A memorial hall containing some of her belongings and photographs stands near the entrance. The main building and gardens are preserved in near original state with original furnishings throughout. In the garage are two large cars: one Chinese built Red Flag limousine and another Russian car presented to Soong by Josef Stalin.

Soong Ch'ing-ling obtained a mansion in Beijing in 1963 where she lived and worked for the rest of her life and received many dignitaries. After her death the site was converted into the Former Residence of Soong Ching-ling as a museum and memorial. The rooms and furniture have been kept as she had used them, and memorabilia are displayed.

Media portrayal 
In the 1997 Hong Kong movie The Soong Sisters, she is portrayed by Maggie Cheung.

In the 2009 mainland China movie The Founding of a Republic, she is portrayed by Xu Qing.

Family

See also 

 History of the Republic of China
 Revolutionary Committee of the Chinese Kuomintang
 He Xiangning (wife of Liao Zhongkai)
 Soong sisters
 Soong Ai-ling
 Soong Mei-ling
 Soong Ching-ling Children's Literature Prize

Notes 

 Before the 1982 Constitution President of the People's Republic of China was officially translated as "Chairman" by the PRC government.

References

Citations

Sources

External links 
 
 Soong Ching-ling Foundation
 Former Residence of Song Qingling, Beijing
 Memorial Residence, Shanghai 

 
1890 births
1981 deaths
Presidents of the People's Republic of China
Women leaders of China
Chinese Methodists
Chinese Communist Party politicians from Shanghai
Female heads of state
People's Republic of China politicians from Shanghai
Republic of China politicians from Shanghai
Members of the Revolutionary Committee of the Chinese Kuomintang
Stalin Peace Prize recipients
Sun Yat-sen family
Vice Chairpersons of the National People's Congress
Vice Chairpersons of the National Committee of the Chinese People's Political Consultative Conference
Vice presidents of the People's Republic of China
Wesleyan College alumni
20th-century Chinese politicians
20th-century Chinese women politicians
Burials in Shanghai
Women vice presidents
All-China Women's Federation people
Deaths from leukemia
Deaths from cancer in the People's Republic of China